Paya Besar may refer to:
Paya Besar, Kedah
Paya Besar, Pahang
Paya Besar (federal constituency), represented in the Dewan Rakyat
Paya Besar (state constituency), formerly represented in the Pahang State Legislative Council